Oskar Wiklund (31 October 1888 – 26 August 1942) was a Finnish wrestler. He competed in the light heavyweight event at the 1912 Summer Olympics.

References

External links
 

1888 births
1942 deaths
People from Vesilahti
People from Häme Province (Grand Duchy of Finland)
Olympic wrestlers of Finland
Wrestlers at the 1912 Summer Olympics
Finnish male sport wrestlers
Sportspeople from Pirkanmaa